The enzyme 4-methyloxaloacetate esterase (EC 3.1.1.44) catalyzes the reaction 

oxaloacetate 4-methyl ester + H2O  oxaloacetate + methanol

This enzyme belongs to the family of hydrolases, specifically those acting on carboxylic ester bonds.  The systematic name is oxaloacetate-4-methyl-ester oxaloacetohydrolase.

References

 

EC 3.1.1
Enzymes of unknown structure